Pompeii: The Last Day is a 2003 dramatized documentary that tells of the eruption of Mount Vesuvius towards the end of October, 79 AD.   This eruption covered the Roman cities of Pompeii and Herculaneum in ash and pumice, killing a large number of people trapped between the volcano and the sea. The documentary, which portrays the different phases of the eruption, was directed by Peter Nicholson and written by Edward Canfor-Dumas.

Production
The film is directed and produced by the BBC in co-production with TLC.

Awards 

Winner: sound supervisor Simon Farmer won the 2005 Primetime Emmy Award for Outstanding Sound Editing for Nonfiction Programming (Single or Multi-Camera) for this production.
 Nominations: BAFTA 2004 nominations for Flaherty and RT Audience
 Winner: BBC Factual Audience Award
 Winner: RTS Education Award

This was the highest rated specialist factual programme of the year with an audience of 10.3 million and a 40% share.

Plot
The documentary tells the story of the eruption of Mount Vesuvius from the point of view of assorted inhabitants of Pompeii and Herculaneum whose names and occupations are known, including a local politician and his family, a fuller, his wife, and two gladiators. Historical characters include Pliny the Elder and his nephew Pliny the Younger. It draws heavily on the eyewitness account of Pliny the Younger, as well as historical research and recent discoveries in volcanology. Extensive CGI was used to recreate the effects of the eruption.

Death throes

Most of the people who were in Pompeii when the fourth pyroclastic surge hit either died instantly or slowly suffocated to death.

The death throes of those in the family of Julius Polybius are based upon the 1975 discovery of the skeleton of a heavily pregnant girl (Julia) surrounded by her family, in the actual House of Julius Polybius. Julia's husband, Sabinus, is shown to have most likely poisoned himself and presumably was the skeleton lying near the foot of the bed Julia's body was found on, along with the bones of her fetus.
The death of Stephanus the Fuller is based upon a cast found of a man in the fetal position (the cast is locked up in an onsite warehouse for safekeeping).
The death of Stephanus' wife, Fortunata, is based upon the discovery of the body of a rich bejeweled lady in the gladiator barracks, alongside those of gladiators.
In Herculaneum, the death throes are much simpler, as most people were found during excavations either on the beach or inside the boat houses. Additionally, unlike Pompeii, when the pyroclastic surges hit Herculaneum, people there were instantly killed, whereas most Pompeians slowly suffocated, although some died instantly.

Cast

Gallery

References

External links

Official Press Release at BBC Press Office
Official Press Pack at BBC Press Office
 

Pompeii in popular culture
BBC television docudramas
Discovery Channel original programming
Documentary films about volcanoes
Emmy Award-winning programs
2003 television specials
Films set in Campania
Films set in ancient Rome
Films set in 79 AD
BBC television documentaries about prehistoric and ancient history